Norbert Kindlmann (born 30 June 1944) is a German rower. He competed in the men's eight event at the 1972 Summer Olympics.

References

1944 births
Living people
German male rowers
Olympic rowers of West Germany
Rowers at the 1972 Summer Olympics
Sportspeople from Wiesbaden